Culture Club Collect – 12" Mixes Plus is a compilation album by British band Culture Club, first released in 1991 by Virgin for the VIP Series. The album includes remixes and extended versions of Culture Club songs that were recorded for their first four albums (1982–1986) plus a couple of their stand-out tracks, some B-sides as well as the P. W. Botha 12" Remix of lead singer Boy George’s solo British and European Number One single "Everything I Own".

Track listing 

 "Move Away" (12" Mix) – 7:28 (Culture Club, Pickett)
 "It's a Miracle/Miss Me Blind" (US 12" Mix) – 9:10 (Culture Club, Pickett)
 "God Thank You Woman" (Extended Version) – 7:04 (Culture Club, Pickett)
 "I'll Tumble 4 Ya" (US 12" Remix) – 4:38 (Culture Club)
 "Love Is Cold (You Were Never No Good)" – 4:22 (Culture Club)
 "Do You Really Want to Hurt Me" (Dub Version, featuring Pappa Weasel) – 3:38 (Culture Club)
 "Everything I Own" (Extended P.W. Botha Mix) – 7:13 (Gates)
 "Colour by Numbers" – 3:57 (Culture Club)
 "From Luxury to Heartache" – 4:23 (Culture Club, Pickett)
 "Time (Clock of the Heart)" (Instrumental Mix) – 3:46 (Culture Club)
 "Black Money" – 5:19 (Culture Club)
 "Love Is Love" – 3:51 (O’Dowd, Hay)
 "Man Shake" – 2:35 (Culture Club)
 "The War Song" (Ultimate Dance Mix) – 6:18 (Culture Club)

Musicians/Personnel/Staff/Production 
Boy George – male vocals
Mikey Craig – bass
Roy Hay – guitar, piano, keyboards, sitar, electric guitar
Jon Moss – percussion, drums; mix on track 8
Helen Terry – female vocals
Arif Mardin, Lew Hahn: production on tracks 1, 3
Steve Levine: production on tracks 2, 4, 5, 6, 8, 10, 11, 12, 13, 14; mix on track 8
Stewart Levine: production on track 7
Tony Swain: production on track 9
Richard Lengyer: engineer on track 5
Gordon Milne: assistant engineer on track 6
Glen Skinner: engineer on track 7
Acos Kaikitis for P.D.S.: sleeve design

Release details

References

External links 
Amazon.com

Culture Club albums
1991 greatest hits albums
Albums produced by Arif Mardin
Albums produced by Steve Levine
1991 remix albums
Virgin Records remix albums
EMI Records remix albums
Caroline Records remix albums